The following list provides the earwigs currently identified from Australia.

Family Anisolabididae
 Anisolabis australis Tindale, 1923
 Anisolabis dohrni (Kirby, 1891)
 Anisolabis flavocapitata Steinmann, 1979
 Anisolabis littorea (White, 1846)
 Anisolabis maritima (Bonelli, 1832)
 Anisolabis nigrofusca Steinmann, 1979
 Anisolabis pacifica (Erichson, 1842)
 Anisolabis subarmata (Kirby, 1900)
 Anisolabis westralica Burr, 1911
 Antisolabis gisleni (Hincks, 1954)
 Antisolabis holdhausi (Burr, 1910)
 Antisolabis notonoma Hincks, 1952
 Carcinophora occidentalis (Kirby, 1896)
 Carcinophora venusta Steinmann, 1989
 Euborellia annulipes (Lucas, 1847)
 Euborellia brunneri (Dohrn, 1864)
 Euborellia jeekeli Srivastava, 1985
 Gonolabis dentata Steinmann, 1981
 Gonolabis electa Burr, 1910
 Gonolabis forcipata Burr, 1908
 Gonolabis gilesi Steinmann, 1981
 Gonolabis rossi Brindle, 1987
 Gonolabis tasmanica (Bormans, 1880)
 Gonolabis woodwardi Burr, 1908
 Isolabis cavagnaroi Brindle, 1987
 Metisolabis punctata (Dubrony, 1879)
 Parisopsalis spryi Burr, 1914
 Titanolabis bormansi Srivastava, 1983
 Titanolabis centaurea Steinmann, 1985
 Titanolabis colossea (Dohrn, 1864)
 Titanolabis gigas Steinmann, 1989
 Zacheria dentata (Burr, 1908)

Family Apachyidae
 Apachyus athertonensis Mjöberg, 1924
 Apachyus beccarii Dubrony, 1879
 Apachyus peterseni Borelli, 1925
 Apachyus queenslandicus Mjöberg, 1924
 Chelisoches ater Bormans, 1900
 Chelisoches australicus (Le Guillou, 1841)
 Chelisoches handschini Günther, 1934
 Chelisoches kimberleyensis Mjöberg, 1913
 Chelisoches morio (Fabricius, 1775)
 Hamaxas feae (Bormans, 1894)
 Hamaxas nigrorufus (Burr, 1902)
 Lamprophorella kervillei (Burr, 1905)
 Proreus duruoides Hebard, 1933

Family Forficulidae
 Doru spiculiferum (Kirby, 1891)
 Elaunon bipartitus (Kirby, 1891)
 Eparchus insignis (De Haan, 1842)
 Forficula auricularia Linnaeus, 1758 (introduced)
 Forficula vilmi Steinmann, 1989
 Syntonus venus Steinmann, 1993

Family Labiduridae
 Gonolabidura meteor Steinmann, 1985
 Labidura riparia (Pallas, 1773)
 Nala lividipes (Dufour, 1820)

Family Pygidicranidae
 Austroblandex bituberculatus Brindle, 1987
 Brindlensia jeekeli Srivastava, 1985
 Cranopygia daemeli (Dohrn, 1869)
 Cranopygia lueddemanni Srivastava, 1984
 Cranopygia ophthalmica (Dohrn, 1863)
 Dacnodes hackeri (Burr, 1914)
 Dacnodes shortridgei (Burr, 1914)
 Echinosoma sumatranum (de Haan, 1842)
 Echinosoma yorkense Dohrn, 1869

Family Spongiphoridae
 Auchenomus bifurcus Steinmann, 1984
 Chaetospania australica (Bormans, 1883)
 Chaetospania mjobergi Brindle, 1971
 Irdex hilaris (Bormans, 1900)
 Irdex unicolor Steinmann, 1985
 Labia minor (Linnaeus, 1758)
 Marava arachidis (Yersin, 1860)
 Marava feae (Dubrony, 1879)
 Marava luzonica (Dohrn, 1864)
 Marava tricolor (Kirby, 1891)
 Nesogaster amoena (Stål, 1855)
 Nesogaster halli Hincks, 1949
 Nesogaster rehni Hincks, 1951
 Nesogaster ruficeps (Erichson, 1842)
 Paralabella curvicauda (Motschulsky, 1863)
 Paralabella murrayi (Kirby, 1900)
 Paraspania australiana (Mjöberg, 1913)
 Paraspania brunneri (Bormans, 1883)
 Paraspania discors Steinmann, 1985
 Paraspania pygmaea (Mjöberg, 1924)
 Paraspania torpeo Steinmann, 1990
 Spirolabia pilicornis (Motschulsky, 1863)
 Spongovostox doddi (Burr, 1914)
 Spongovostox hackeri (Burr, 1914)
 Spongovostox nigroflavidus (Rehn, 1905)
 Spongovostox subapterus (Kirby, 1891)
 Spongovostox victoriae (Burr, 1914)

See also
 List of Dermapterans of Sri Lanka

References

Earwigs
Dermapterans